During the 2001–02 English football season, Coventry City F.C. competed in the Football League First Division, following relegation from the FA Premier League the previous season.

Season summary
Despite the signing of prolific striker Lee Hughes from local rivals West Bromwich Albion, Coventry City were unable to make a genuine push for an immediate return to the Premier League and finished well away from promotion in 11th place. Manager Gordon Strachan had been sacked after five games with only one win and Coventry 19th; this heralded the beginning of an eleven-match unbeaten run which saw Coventry top the table with a third of the season gone, but from then three straight losses took them down to ninth. Coventry never regained the form from that unbeaten run, but with seven games left to play they stood fourth and appeared almost certain to gain a playoff place. Unfortunately, Coventry only gained one point from those last seven games and fell down to 11th place.

Final league table

 Pld = Matches ; W = Matches won; D = Matches drawn; L = Matches lost; F = Goals for; A = Goals against; GD = Goal difference; Pts = Points
 NB: In the Football League goals scored (F) takes precedence over goal difference (GD).

Results
Coventry City's score comes first

Legend

Football League First Division

FA Cup

League Cup

Squad

Left club during season

Reserve squad

Transfers

In
  Julian Joachim -  Aston Villa, 6 July, part-exchange
  Keith O'Neill -  Middlesbrough, 8 August, £750,000
  Lee Hughes -  West Bromwich Albion, 8 August, £5,000,001
  Youssef Safri -  Raja Casablanca, 11 August, £700,000
  Andy Goram - unattached (last at  Hamilton Academical), 24 August
  Lee Mills -  Portsmouth, 1 January, £250,000
  Paul Trollope -  Fulham, 22 March, free

Out
  Stephen McPhee - released (later joined  Port Vale on 24 June)
  Craig Bellamy -  Newcastle United, 25 June, £6,000,000
  John Aloisi -  Osasuna, 3 July, £1,200,000
  Mustapha Hadji -  Aston Villa, 6 July, £2,000,000 plus Julian Joachim
  John Hartson -  Celtic, 2 August, £6,000,000
  Chris Kirkland -  Liverpool, 31 August, £6,000,000 
  Paul Williams -  Southampton, 31 October, free
  Paul Telfer -  Southampton, 31 October, free
  Carlton Palmer -  Stockport County, 6 November, free
  Tomas Gustafsson -  Copenhagen, 4 February, undisclosed
  Lee Carsley -  Everton, 8 February, £1,900,000
  Roland Nilsson - retired, 8 April 
  Steve Froggatt - retired
  Andy Goram -  Oldham Athletic

Loan in
  Lee Mills -  Portsmouth, December, one month
  Horacio Carbonari -  Derby County, 22 March, one month
  Colin Healy -  Celtic, 29 January, 84 days
  Tim Flowers -  Leicester City

Loan out
  Carlton Palmer -  Sheffield Wednesday, 4 September, 46 days

References

Coventry City F.C. seasons
Coventry City